Apagy is a village in Szabolcs-Szatmár-Bereg County in the Northern Great Plain region of eastern Hungary.

Communications

The Vásárosnamény–Nyíregyháza line of the Hungarian State Railways (MÁV) serves the village.

History

Because of its convenient location, Apagy became an important place of commerce and for holding county meetings. It was here that the decision was made to have Nyíregyháza as the county seat of Szabolcs County.

A charter of 1466 names Mohos as the neighbouring settlement of Apagy, and at that time it was owned by the Várday family.

At the start of the 15th century, the Kemecsey family became the owners. In the first half of the 16th century more families started to farm around Apagy: the Apagyi, Csajkos, Diószeghy, Hetey, Osváth, Puskas, Szegedy, Szentmiklóssy, Szécsy, Szilágyi and Zoltán families.

Apagy also held the 1608 Parliament.

The village started registering births, deaths and marriages in 1768.

The village really started to develop during the 18th century, and after the construction of the railway it became a local commercial hub.

At the start of the 20th century the Zoltán family (and descendants) farmed the land, and the major landholder was Mayer Leveleki.

Before World War II, there was a Jewish community in the town. At its height, there were 160 Jews in the community most of them were murdered by the Nazis in the Holocaust.
The Jewish cemetery in the village still exists.

Ethnic groups
As of 2009 The ethnography of the village was 99.9% Hungarian, with 1.1% Romani, adding to a grand total of 101%.

Landmarks
 15th-century United Reformed Church, in Gothic style, decorated and furnished in Art Nouveau style
 Lake Mohos Nature Reserve

Sports
The local football team was founded in 1954. In the 1995–96 season they won the Hungarian National Championship VI and were promoted to the Hungarian National Championship V.

References

External links
 Apagyi Football Club
 Apagyi Football Ultras
 Apagy official website
 Lake Bíró in Apagy
 Bíró Farm in Apagy
 Lake Kenderázta in Apagy
 Apagy Tourist Information
 Information and pictures about Apagy

Apagy
Jewish communities destroyed in the Holocaust